Dorothy Johnston (born 1948) is an Australian author of both crime and literary fiction. She has published novels, short stories and essays.

Born in Geelong, Victoria, Australia, Johnston trained as a teacher at the University of Melbourne and later worked as a researcher in the education field. She lived in Canberra from 1979 to 2008, and currently lives in Ocean Grove, Victoria (Australia). She is a former President of Canberra PEN. She was a founding member of the Seven Writers Group, also known as Seven Writers or the Canberra Seven, established in March 1980. Five of the original members ceased with the group, but Johnston and Margaret Barbalet continued with new writers.

She was a member of Writers Against Nuclear Arms, with her novel Maralinga, My Love, focusing on the impacts of nuclear testing in Australia.

Awards and grants 

 1987 - shortlisted Miles Franklin Award for Ruth
 1988 - highly commended ABC / ABA Bicentennial Literary Award for Maralinga, My Love
 1988 - Australia Council fellowship
 1991 - ACT Literary Award (grant) to complete a book of stories about life in Canberra
 1998 - shortlisted Miles Franklin Award for One for the Master
 2001 - joint winner ACT Book of the Year for The Trojan Dog
 2001 - highly commended Davitt Award for The Trojan Dog

Bibliography

Novels
Her books include the Sandra Mahoney quartet of mystery novels.

Sandra Mahoney series
 The Trojan Dog (2000)
 The White Tower (2003)
 Eden (2007)
 The Fourth Season (2014)

Sea-Change Mystery series
 Through a Camel's Eye (2016)
 The Swan Island Connection (2017)

Standalone novels
 Tunnel Vision (1984)
 Ruth (1986)
 Maralinga, My Love (1988)
 One for the Master (1997)
 The House at Number 10 (2005)

Short stories
 "The New Parliament House" and "The Boatman Of Lake Burley Griffin", published in Canberra Tales: Stories (1988) (reprinted as The Division of Love: Stories, 1995); Below the Water Line (1999) and The Invisible Thread, A Hundred Years of Words (2012)
 "A Christmas Story", published in Motherlove (1996)
 "Two Wrecks", published in Best Australian Stories (2008) and Best Australian Stories: A Ten-year Collection (2011)
 "Quicksilver's Ride", published in Best Australian Stories (2009)

Essays
 "Female Sleuths And Family Matters: Can Genre and Literary Fiction Coalesce?", published in Australian Book Review (2000)
 "A Script With No Words", published in HEAT New Series 1 (2001)
 "Disturbing Undertones", published in The Griffith Review (2007)
 "But when she was bad...", published in The Australian Literary Review (2008)
 "The sounds of silence", published in The Age (2009)
 "Fiction's ever present danger", published in Spectrum (January 2011)

References

External links 
 Home page

1948 births
People from Geelong
20th-century Australian novelists
21st-century Australian novelists
Australian essayists
Australian women novelists
Australian women short story writers
Writers from Canberra
Writers from Victoria (Australia)
Living people
20th-century Australian women writers
21st-century Australian women writers
20th-century Australian short story writers
21st-century Australian short story writers
20th-century essayists
21st-century essayists